Ugo Humbert was the defending champion but chose not to defend his title.

Leandro Riedi won the title after defeating Mikhail Kukushkin 7–6(7–4), 6–3 in the final.

Seeds

Draw

Finals

Top half

Bottom half

References

External links
Main draw
Qualifying draw

Internazionali di Tennis Castel del Monte - 1
2022 Singles